The 2000 Metro Atlantic Athletic Conference baseball tournament took place on May 21 and 22, 2000. The top four regular season finishers of the league's teams met in the single-elimination tournament held at Dutchess Stadium in Wappingers Falls, New York.  won their first tournament championship and earned the conference's automatic bid to the 2000 NCAA Division I baseball tournament.

Seeding 
The top four teams were seeded one through four based on their conference winning percentage. They then played a single-elimination tournament.

Results

All-Tournament Team 
The following players were named to the All-Tournament Team.

Most Valuable Player 
Kevin Ool was named Tournament Most Outstanding Player. Ool was a freshman pitcher for Marist.

References 

Tournament
Metro Atlantic Athletic Conference Baseball Tournament
Metro Atlantic Athletic Conference baseball tournament